The Starmer Project: A Journey to the Right is a 2022 book by British journalist Oliver Eagleton, published by Verso Books. It is a political biography of British opposition and Labour Party leader Keir Starmer, and follows his time in the Crown Prosecution Service and Shadow Cabinet of Jeremy Corbyn, his predecessor, covering his political alliances, his victory in the 2020 Labour Party leadership election, and subsequent leadership of the Labour Party.

Background 
Starmer is a Member of Parliament (MP) for the Labour Party, a centre-left political party in the United Kingdom that acts as the main political opposition to the Conservative Party government. He was elected party leader in April 2020, after his predecessor Jeremy Corbyn presided over a landslide defeat in the 2019 general election. The Labour Party leadership of Corbyn saw a shift to the left from the centre-ground. Starmer ran on both a soft left and centrist platform, and suspended Corbyn from the Parliamentary Labour Party in January 2021.

Oliver Eagleton, The Starmer Projects author, is an editor for socialist journal New Left Review, and writes articles for alternative media organisation Novara Media, which has a left-wing outlook. He began writing The Starmer Project after posting a blog about Starmer's tenure as Director of Public Prosecutions in January 2021, announcing the book in August with an expected release date of May 2022. Although Eagleton has a negative view of Starmer, he commented: "It is important to be constructive and clear-eyed. I hope that the tone of the book isn't just polemical." The Starmer Project is Eagleton's first book and was published by Verso Books. He is the son of writer Terry Eagleton.

Synopsis 
The Starmer Project is hostile to Starmer and portrays him as a ruthless individual who sabotaged Corbyn's Labour leadership to become the new party leader. He promised to continue Corbyn's policies if elected leader but purged the left from the party leadership upon gaining power. His libertarianism slowly turns into paternalism, and he pledges to give Britain's voters security. Starmer focuses on non-partisan issues, such as incompetence, and is described as an authoritarian centrist who wants technocratic reform. He is also alleged to be contradictory throughout his career.

The book criticises Labour's election victories during the centrist New Labour period but praises its defeat in the 2017 general election under Corbyn because, according to Eagleton, New Labour "lost millions of votes after its landslide victory" in the 1997 general election, while the loss in 2017 had "the biggest swing to Labour since 1945".

Reception 
Tom Harris of The Daily Telegraph gave the book two out of five stars, criticising its defence of the political positions of Corbyn and accusing it of left-wing bias. Harris conceded that some of its content was valid but said that Eagleton's bias had made it "difficult to take the rest of his political agenda seriously". Richard Seymour of the New Statesman calls the book "[t]he most detailed study of the Labour leader" and "the best account of his leadership so far". The Independents Andrew Grice described the book as a "cogent left-wing critique" of Starmer's Labour leadership. He adds that while Eagleton appears too pessimistic around Starmer's climate action and opposition to rentier capitalism, he is correct to call for more action against the ruling Conservative Party. Patrick Maguire of The Times calls the book an "aggressive, critical account of [Starmer's] time in public life" and "the meatiest biography of the leader of the opposition to date". He believes "Eagleton's depiction of the politics of Starmer's parliamentary career [to be] wide off the mark".

References

External links 
 

2022 non-fiction books
British biographies
Books about British politicians
Books about politics of the United Kingdom
Keir Starmer
Verso Books books